Tholi Muddhu is a 1993 Indian Telugu-language teen romance film directed by K. Rushendra Reddy and starring Prashanth and Divya Bharati. The film is a remake of the 1990 Bollywood Super Hit Dil. The soundtrack was composed by Ilaiyaraaja. The film was dubbed into Tamil as Ilam Nenje Vaa. This was the last Telugu film of actress, Divya Bharti which was posthumously released six months after her death. Unfinished portions were otherwise completed by actress Rambha, who slightly resembled the latter's original body (the credits were otherwise kept as Divya Bharti's name only throughout the film). The film was commercially successful.

Plot 
Prashanth and Divya get married without informing anyone. Soon enough, Divya's father tries to make their life a living hell.

Cast 
 Prashanth as Prashanth
 Divya Bharti as Divya
 Rambha As Divya
 Brahmanandam as Police Inspector
Kota Srinivasa Rao as Kotishwara Raayudu
Captain Raju as Mr. Gupta
Senthil as Swamiji
Raaki
Ali
Ironleg Sastri
Annapoorna
Pandari Bari

Production 
Due to Divya Bharti's death on 5 April 1993, the film was partly completed by actress Rambha in Divya's role while Roja Ramani dubbed her voice.

Soundtrack

Telugu version
The original score by Ilaiyaraaja consists of 6 tracks. The song "Vaane Laddi" was not included in the movie.

Tamil version
Music composed by Ilaiyaraaja consists of 6 tracks and were released in 1995.

References 

1993 films
1990s Telugu-language films
Films scored by Ilaiyaraaja
Telugu remakes of Hindi films
1993 romantic drama films
Indian romantic drama films
1993 directorial debut films